Kondomari or Kontomari is a Greek village, part of the municipality of Platanias in Crete. It is located near the northern coast of Crete, 18 km west of Chania and 3 km southeast of Maleme.

It is known for being the site of the Kondomari Massacre on 2 June 1941, when at least 23 civilians were executed by German paratroopers after the Battle of Crete as a reprisal for the deaths of several German soldiers. Kondomari has been declared a martyred village by presidential decree and a memorial in the village lists the names of the victims and has a wall of tiles portraying the incident.

See also
List of communities of Chania

References

Populated places in Chania (regional unit)